Desi or Deshi is a self-referential term used by South Asian people.

Desi may also refer to:

Desi (raga), a raga (also known as Deshi) in Indian classical music
Desi daru, an Indian alcoholic beverage
Desi ghee, a term used to differentiate between country-made ghee and vegetable ghee

People
"Desi" is also a Spanish language male given name, derived from "Desideri". People with the name Desi include:

Desi Anwar, Indonesian news presenter
Desi Arnaz (1917–1986), Cuban-born American musician, actor, comedian and television producer
Desi Arnaz, Jr. (born 1953), American actor and musician
Desi Barmore (born 1960), American-Israeli basketball player
Dési Bouterse (born 1945), president of Suriname
Desi Curry, Northern Irish football manager
Desi Lydic (born 1981), American actress (in her case, "Desi" being derived from "Desmonet")
Desi Relaford (born 1973), American professional baseball player

Acronym
As an acronym, DESI may refer to:
Desorption electrospray ionization, an ambient ionization technique for mass spectrometry
Drug Efficacy Study Implementation
The Dark Energy Spectroscopic Instrument, an astronomical instrument currently operating as part of a campaign to measure millions of galaxy spectra
 Digital Economy and Society Index, a composite index that summarises relevant indicators on the digital performance of the Member States of the European Union

Other uses
Desi (film), a 2000 Dutch documentary film directed by Maria Ramos
Desi (Tibet), the Tibetan term for a secular ruler, viceroy, or prime minister
Druk Desi, historical title for a civil administrative leader in Bhutan
Short for uchi-deshi, Japanese term for a live-in apprentice
.desi, a top-level Internet domain

See also
American-Born Confused Desi (ABCD), a term used to refer to South Asians born in the United States
American Desi, a 2001 American film with an Indian influence, featuring many prominent South Asian American actors